Balston may refer to:

 Thomas Balston (1883–1967), member of the Whatman paper-making family
 Edward Balston (1817–1891), English schoolmaster
 Nannatherina balstoni, also known as Balston's pygmy perch